Alicún de Ortega is a village located at the province of Granada, Spain. According to the 2005 census (INE), it has a population of 563 inhabitants.

References

Municipalities in the Province of Granada